This is a list of earthquakes in 1995. Only earthquakes of magnitude 6 or above are included, unless they result in damage or casualties, or are notable for some other reason.  All dates are listed according to UTC time.

By death toll

By magnitude

By month

January

Knidi earthquake 
The a 6.6 Mw earthquake occurred in Knidi, Grevena, Greece on May 13, 1995.

Neftegorsk earthquake
The 1995 Neftegorsk earthquake was a 7.1 Mw (7.3 MS) earthquake that devastated the town of Neftegorsk in northern Sakhalin Island, Russia on May 27, 1995 at 23:03 Russian time (13:03 UTC).

Neftegorsk was nearly destroyed completely by the earthquake. Approximately 2,000 of the 3,176 residents in the town were killed.

Myanmar–China earthquake
The 1995 Myanmar–China earthquake occurred on July 11 at 21:46 UTC  in Shan State, Myanmar, near the border with Yunnan. It measured  7.3 and was assigned a maximum intensity of VIII. At least 11 people died and 136 were injured. This was one of a few earthquakes ever successfully predicted, and is attributed to saving many lives.

Antofagasta earthquake
The 1995 Antofagasta earthquake was an earthquake with a strength of 8.0 Mw registered on July 30, 1995 at 05:11 UTC (01:11 local time). Its epicenter was located near off the coast in the Chilean Sea near Antofagasta, affecting coastal areas of Antofagasta Region.

Guerrero earthquake
The 1995 Guerrero earthquake occurred on September 14, 1995 at 14:04 UTC (08:04 local time). This earthquake had a magnitude of 7.4 Mw, with the epicenter being located in the state of Guerrero, Mexico. Three people were reported dead. In the rural part of southeast Guerrero, many houses with adobe of poor quality suffered heavier damage. The intensity in Copala reached MM VII. The earthquake could be felt strongly along the coast from Michoacán to Chiapas.

Colima-Jalisco earthquake
The 1995 Colima–Jalisco earthquake was an 8.0 Mw earthquake which occurred on October 9, 1995 at 15:36 UTC, off the coast of Jalisco, Mexico, with least 49 people dead and 100 more injured. The earthquake triggered a tsunami, which affected a 200 km coast. The Cihuatlan-Manzanillo area, Colima, was more severely affected than other areas. The earthquake was felt in Mexico City and in high-rise buildings in Dallas and Houston.

Chiapas earthquake
The 1995 Chiapas earthquake occurred on October 20, 1995 at 20:38 local time (October 21, 1995 at 02:38 UTC). The epicenter was located in the state of Chiapas, Mexico, near Tuxtla Gutiérrez. It had a magnitude of Mw 7.1, or ML 6.5. Building damage was reported. Around 70 people were reported injured. In Tuxtla Gutiérrez, telephone and electricity services were momentarily interrupted.

Wuding earthquake
The 1995 Wuding earthquake occurred on October 23, 1995 at 22:46 UTC (October 24, 1995 at 06:46 local time). The epicenter was located near Fenduo Village (芬多村), Fawo Township (发窝乡) of the Wuding County, Yunnan, China. The magnitude of the earthquake was put at Mw 6.2, or Ms 6.5. 53 people were reported dead and 13,903 people injured. Many houses and public buildings were damaged, including the Fawo Middle School (发窝中学) and the Fawo Township Office.

Gulf of Aqaba earthquake
The 1995 Gulf of Aqaba earthquake was a 7.1 magnitude earthquake that occurred on November 22, 1995 at 04:15 local time, in the eastern part of Egypt. At least 8 people were killed and 30 were injured in the epicentral region. Damage occurred in many parts of northeastern Egypt as far as Cairo. One person was killed and two slightly injured at Al Bad, Saudi Arabia. Some damage occurred at Jerusalem, Israel and Aqaba, Jordan.

References

 
1995
1995